Apart from Soviet–Afghan War (1979-1989) it may also refer to:

Urtatagai conflict (1925–1926)
Red Army intervention in Afghanistan (1929)
Red Army intervention in Afghanistan (1930)